Jolene is a feminine given name, commonly shortened as Jolie meaning "pretty" in French.

Variant forms 
Jolene has several spelling variations:

 Joelene
 Joleen
 Joleene
 Jolene
 Joliene 
 Joline
 Jouline 
 Jolin
 Jolleen
 Jollene
 Jolyn
 Jolyne
 Jolynn
Joleane
 Jolean

People 
People with the given name Jolene:
 Jolene Anderson (born 1980), Australian actress
 Jolene Blalock (born 1975), American actress from Star Trek: Enterprise
 Jolene Brand (born 1934), American actress
 Jolene Henderson (born 1991), American softball pitcher
 Jolene Koester, president of California State University, Northridge
 Jolene Purdy (born 1983), American actress from Orange Is The New Black.  
 Jolene Unsoeld (1931–2021), American politician
 Jolene Van Vugt (born 1980), Canadian motocross champion
 Jolene Marie Cholock-Rotinsulu (born 1996), Puteri Indonesia Lingkungan 2019 & Miss International Indonesia 2019
 Jolene Watanabe (1968–2019), American tennis player
 Jolene Yazzie (born 1978), American graphic designer

Census 
Jolene ranks 624 out of 4275 for females of all ages in the 1990 U.S. Census.

Popular culture 
The title track of Dolly Parton's 1973 album, "Jolene", is about the protagonist begging a beautiful woman named Jolene to not take her lover.

The sixth story arc of the manga series JoJo's Bizarre Adventure, titled Stone Ocean, features a main protagonist named Jolyne Cujoh.

In Paper Mario: The Thousand-Year Door, Jolene is a Toad that runs the Glitz Pit, a fighting arena located in Glitzville.

References

French feminine given names
Feminine given names